IF Elfsborg did not repeat its 2006 league title, but at least managed to qualify for the group stage of the UEFA Cup, following the victory against Dinamo Bucharest in the play-off round, into which they had been relegated from the Champions League, where they had lost to Valencia in the final play-off round.

Squad

Goalkeepers
  Johan Wiland
  Abbas Hassan

Defenders
  Mathias Florén
  Johan Karlsson
  Martin Andersson
  Daniel Mobaeck
  Markus Falk-Olander
  Fredrik Björck
  Andreas Augustsson
  Jon Jönsson

Midfielders
  Jari Ilola
  Anders Svensson
  Emir Bajrami
  Stefan Ishizaki
  Elmin Kurbegović
  Daniel Eres
  Léandre Griffit
  Samuel Holmén
  Daniel Alexandersson

Attackers
  Joakim Sjöhage
  Mathias Svensson
  James Keene
  Fredrik Berglund

Allsvenskan

Matches

 Elfsborg-Malmö FF 1-1
 0-1 Jonatan Johansson 
 1-1 Samuel Holmén 
 Örebro-Elfsborg 1-1
 0-1 Emir Bajrami 
 1-1 Nedim Halilović 
 Elfsborg-Gefle 1-1
 0-1 Johannes Ericsson 
 1-1 Stefan Ishizaki 
 Helsingborg-Elfsborg 0-1
 0-1 Andreas Augustsson 
 Elfsborg-Djurgården 2-2
 1-0 Jon Jönsson 
 1-1 Robert Stoltz 
 2-1 Anders Svensson 
 2-2 Mikael Dahlberg 
 Kalmar FF-Elfsborg 2-1
 1-0 Patrik Ingelsten 
 2-0 Viktor Elm 
 2-1 Anders Svensson 
 Trelleborg-Elfsborg 1-2
 0-1 Mathias Svensson 
 1-1 Michael Mensah 
 1-2 Anders Svensson 
 Elfsborg-IFK Göteborg 3-1
 0-1 Marcus Berg 
 1-1 Anders Svensson 
 2-1 Anders Svensson 
 3-1 Anders Svensson 
 Hammarby-Elfsborg 0-1
 0-1 Daniel Alexandersson 
 GAIS-Elfsborg 2-1
 1-0 Bobbie Friberg da Cruz 
 1-1 James Keene 
 2-1 Fredrik Lundgren 
 Elfsborg-Trelleborg 2-0
 1-0 James Keene 
 2-0 Mathias Svensson 
 Elfsborg-Brommapojkarna 3-0
 1-0 Stefan Ishizaki 
 2-0 James Keene 
 3-0 Daniel Alexandersson 
 Halmstad-Elfsborg 3-0
 1-0 Dušan Đurić 
 2-0 Mikael Rosén 
 3-0 Hasse Mattisson 
 AIK-Elfsborg 0-1
 0-1 Stefan Ishizaki 
 Elfsborg-AIK 2-0
 1-0 James Keene 
 2-0 Mathias Svensson 
 Djurgården-Elfsborg 2-1
 0-1 Fredrik Berglund 
 1-1 Thiago Quirino 
 2-1 Toni Kuivasto 
 Elfsborg-Kalmar FF 2-2
 0-1 Rasmus Elm 
 1-1 Stefan Ishizaki 
 2-1 Stefan Ishizaki 
 2-2 César Santín 
 Elfsborg-GAIS 5-1
 0-1 Bobbie Friberg da Cruz 
 1-1 Stefan Ishizaki 
 2-1 Samuel Holmén 
 3-1 Fredrik Björck 
 4-1 Fredrik Berglund 
 5-1 Andreas Augustsson 
 Elfsborg-Helsingborg 0-0
 Gefle-Elfsborg 2-2
 1-0 Johan Oremo 
 1-1 Anders Svensson 
 2-1 Daniel Bernhardsson 
 2-2 Mathias Svensson 
 IFK Göteborg-Elfsborg 2-2
 1-0 Gustaf Svensson 
 2-0 Jonas Wallerstedt 
 2-1 Stefan Ishizaki 
 2-2 Stefan Ishizaki 
 Elfsborg-Hammarby 1-2
 1-0 Mathias Svensson 
 1-1 Sebastián Eguren 
 1-2 Sebastián Eguren 
 Brommapojkarna-Elfsborg 1-1
 0-1 Fredrik Berglund 
 1-1 Martin Ekström 
 Elfsborg-Halmstad 1-1
 0-1 Dušan Đurić 
 1-1 Anders Svensson 
 Elfsborg-Örebro 0-2
 0-1 Lars Larsen 
 0-2 Patrik Anttonen 
 Malmö FF-Elfsborg 1-2
 1-0 Júnior 
 1-1 Anders Svensson 
 1-2 Mathias Svensson

Topscorers
  Anders Svensson 9
  Stefan Ishizaki 8
  Mathias Svensson 5
  James Keene 4

Sources
  IF Elfsborg Results at Soccerway

Elfsborg
2007